Brensbach is a municipality in the Odenwaldkreis (district) in Hesse, Germany.

Geography

Location
Brensbach lies in the northern Odenwald in the Gersprenz valley.

Neighbouring communities
Brensbach borders in the north on the towns of Groß-Bieberau and Reinheim (although this boundary is quite short) and the community of Otzberg (all in Darmstadt-Dieburg), in the east on the community of Höchst and the town of Bad König, in the south on the communities of Brombachtal and Reichelsheim and in the west on the communities of Fränkisch-Crumbach (all in the Odenwaldkreis) and Fischbachtal (Darmstadt-Dieburg).

Constituent communities
Brensbach’s Ortsteile are Affhöllerbach, Bierbach, Brensbach, Hippelsbach, Höllerbach, Kilsbach, Mummenroth, Nieder-Kainsbach, Stierbach, Wallbach and Wersau.

Politics
The municipal election held on 26 March 2006 yielded the following results:

Coat of arms
The community’s arms bear three charges on a white (silver) background: in the foot of the escutcheon are some blue waves, above which is a red fire, over which is an arc of five six-pointed stars. The arms are canting, suggesting the community’s name: the verb brennen means “burn” in German, and Bach means “brook”. According to legend, the namesake brook, when seen under starlight, looked as though it might be burning. Likelier, though, it looked so at sunset rather than at night, since stars would not be bright enough to produce such an effect.

Town partnerships
 The community of Brensbach has maintained a partnership arrangement since 1978 with the French community of Ézy-sur-Eure in the Eure department in Normandy.

References

Odenwaldkreis